The robin accentor (Prunella rubeculoides) is a species of bird in the family Prunellidae. It is a brown bird with a grey head and an orange-red breast. It is common in parts of its range and its conservation status has been assessed by the International Union for Conservation of Nature as being of "least concern".

Taxonomy
The robin accentor was described by the English entomologist and ornithologist Frederic Moore in 1854 from a specimen collected in Nepal. He coined the binomial name Accentor rubeculoides. The specific epithet combines the Medieval Latin rubecula for a "robin" and the Ancient Greek -oidēs "resembling". The robin accentor is now placed in the genus Prunella that was introduced by the French ornithologist Louis Vieillot in 1816.

There are two subspecies:
 P. r. muraria Meinertzhagen, R & Meinertzhagen, A, 1926 – west Himalayas
 P. r. rubeculoides (Moore, F, 1854) – central and east Himalayas to central China

Description
The sexes are similar in appearance and have the slender, sharply-pointed beak typical of an insect-eating bird. The head and neck are grey while the other upper parts are brown, streaked with black. The throat is a uniform shade of reddish-orange and the belly pale buff. The wing coverts have white tips. The call is a high trill, or a repeated "tszi tszi". The song is musical and has been rendered as "si-tsi-si-tsi-tsu-tsitsi".

Distribution and habitat
In China it is known from the Tibet Autonomous Region and the provinces of Qinghai, Gansu and Sichuan. It is a non-migratory species normally resident above the tree-line but not as high as the snowline. It is usually seen on the ground in grassland or among scrub, often in gullies containing streams. In the winter it may move to slightly lower elevations and is often found in stony areas close to human habitations.

Behaviour
The robin accentor mostly forages on the ground for insects, other invertebrates and seeds. Small groups of birds may feed together. A female often mates with several males, and each male attempts to remove any sperm already present in her cloaca before himself mounting her. The nest is built off the ground in tussock grass, bushes or scrub. It is cup-shaped, and a clutch of about four blue or green, unspeckled eggs is laid. The breeding season is between May and August and there may be two broods.

Status
The robin accentor has a wide range and is common in parts of that range. No particular threats have been identified and the population seems stable, so the International Union for Conservation of Nature has assessed its conservation status as being of "least concern".

References

External links
 Xeno-canto: audio recordings of the robin accentor
Images at ADW

robin accentor
Birds of the Himalayas
Birds of China
robin accentor
Taxonomy articles created by Polbot